= Dermatologic Clinics =

- Subject: Dermatology
- Language: English, English
- Edited by: Bruce H. Thiers

Publication details
- History: 1983–present
- Publisher: Elsevier (United States)
- Frequency: Quarterly
- Impact factor: 3.214 (2017)

Standard abbreviations
- ISO 4: Dermatol. Clin.

Indexing
- ISSN: 0733-8635 (print); 1558-0520 (web)
- LCCN: 84643122
- OCLC no.: 08649114

Links
- Journal homepage

Dermatologic Clinics is a peer-reviewed medical journal published quarterly for the Dermatologic Clinics of North America by Elsevier. It has been published since 1983.

According to the Journal Citation Reports, the journal has a 2017 impact factor of 3.214.
